Waverly Historic District is a national historic district roughly centered on Academy St. and Abington Rd., inc. Carbondale Rd., Beech, Cole, Church and Dearborn St. in Waverly Township, Pennsylvania.  Historic functions of the district include domestic buildings, at least one religious structure, commerce and trade, education and recreation and culture.  The district was built around 1928, and is significant for its architecture.  Styles include Late Victorian, Late 19th And Early 20th Century American Movements.  Architects include George M.D. Lewis and Ephraim Ross.

It was added to the National Register of Historic Places in 2004.

References

External links

Historic districts on the National Register of Historic Places in Pennsylvania
Buildings and structures in Lackawanna County, Pennsylvania
National Register of Historic Places in Lackawanna County, Pennsylvania